Tiodazosin is an α1-adrenergic receptor antagonist.

See also
 Terazosin

References

Alpha-1 blockers
Quinazolines
Oxadiazoles
Thioethers